René Courtin (1900–1964) was a French economist.

1900 births
1964 deaths
French Resistance members
20th-century  French economists